The Luerhmen History and Culture Museum is a historical and cultural complex in Annan District, Tainan, Taiwan.

Name
Luerhmen literal meaning means deer ear gate.

Architecture

The museum building consists of the Luerhmen Tianhou Temple which was built in 1604 dedicated to Mazu statue which were brought by Koxinga, Luerhmen Residence which was built with southern Fujian architectural style and Zheng Cheng-gong Heritage Museum with sets of collections about Koxinga.

Events
The Luerhmen Tianhou Temple, dedicated to Mazu, has invited women to serve as "fairies" responsible for performing religious rituals during the first four days of Chinese New Year every year since the 1990s.

Transportation
The museum is accessible by bus from Tainan Station of Taiwan Railways.

See also
 List of museums in Taiwan

References

External links
 

2004 establishments in Taiwan
History museums in Taiwan
Museums established in 2004
Museums in Tainan